Petiole may refer to:

Petiole (botany), the stalk of a leaf, attaching the blade to the stem
Petiole (insect anatomy), the narrow waist of some hymenopteran insects